Mir Rasool Bux Talpur (13 October 1920 – 1 May 1982), was a Pakistani politician and officeholder.

Governor of Sindh 
He served as Governor of Sindh from 29 April 1972 to 14 February 1973.
He was a descendant of a non-royal family of the clan of Talpurs, and may be recognized in contrast with those who reigned Sindh in the past.

References

External links
 Kolachi, NOS, The News International – Jang
 Corners | Gul Hayat Institute
 Hyderabad Cantonment – GlobalSecurity.org

Governors of Sindh
1920 births
1982 deaths